Agostini Fjord, also known as Agostini Sound (Spanish: seno Agostini), is a fjord in Tierra del Fuego that separates two branches of the Cordillera Darwin, the Cordón Navarro in the southwest and the mountain range that includes Monte Buckland in the northeast. It is named after the Italian explorer Alberto María de Agostini.
The latter range contains some of the most rugged peaks in southern Chile and the former is a mostly ice-covered range. It connected to Magdalena Channel via Keats Sound.

References

External links
 Photo
  Earth Info, earth-info.nga.mil webpage

Fjords of Chile
Bodies of water of Magallanes Region
Landforms of Tierra del Fuego